In hyperbolic geometry, the Meyerhoff manifold is the arithmetic hyperbolic 3-manifold obtained by  surgery on the figure-8 knot complement. It has  the second smallest volume 

of orientable arithmetic hyperbolic 3-manifolds, where  is the zeta function of the quartic field of discriminant . Alternatively,

 

 showed that this manifold is arithmetic.

See also
Gieseking manifold
Weeks manifold

References

3-manifolds
Hyperbolic geometry